"Can't Go Back" is a song by British-American rock group Fleetwood Mac. It was written and performed by guitarist Lindsey Buckingham for the 1982 album Mirage, the fourth issued by the band with Buckingham as main producer. An instrumental demo of "Can't Go Back" appears on the 2016 deluxe edition of Mirage under the working title "Suma's Walk".

In the UK, the track was released as the follow-up to the Top 10 hit "Oh Diane" and became the fourth single to be released from the Mirage album in April 1983. It was released on 7" and 12", with the 12" format including "Tusk" and "Over and Over" from the 1979 album Tusk, and "Rhiannon" from 1975 album Fleetwood Mac. It did not perform well on the UK Singles Chart and stalled at #83.

Despite being released as a single, "Can't Go Back" is yet to be included on any retrospective of Fleetwood Mac material; therefore, it can so far only be found on its parent album Mirage.

Track listings

In the UK, "Can’t Go Back" was released as a 7" single featuring the Mirage track "That’s Alright" as the b-side. Also released as the bands second 12" single, with the 1975 Fleetwood Mac track "Rhiannon" and the 1979 Tusk tracks "Tusk" and "Over and Over".

UK 7" Single (W 9848)
 "Can’t Go Back" – 2:42
 "That’s Alright" - 3:09

UK 12" Single (W 9848 T)
 "Can’t Go Back" – 2:42
 "Rhiannon" – 4:13
 "Tusk" – 3:38
 "Over and Over" – 4:35

Personnel
Mick Fleetwood – double tracked drums, castanets, sleigh bells, maracas
John McVie – bass guitar
Christine McVie – keyboards
Lindsey Buckingham – guitars, vocals, keyboards

References

The Great Rock Discography, 6th Edition, Martin C. Strong. .

External links
 Official Site.

1983 singles
Fleetwood Mac songs
Song recordings produced by Ken Caillat
Song recordings produced by Richard Dashut
Songs written by Lindsey Buckingham
1982 songs
Warner Records singles